Lucky to Be a Woman ( and also known as What a Woman!) is a 1956 Italian comedy film directed by Alessandro Blasetti and starring Sophia Loren, Charles Boyer and Marcello Mastroianni.

Plot
A photographer named Corrado (Mastroianni) snaps a picture of Antonietta (Loren). When it shows up on the front page of a magazine, she wants to take him to court over it. He then tries to convince her that he can connect her up with powerful men and introduces her to Count Gregorio Sennetti (Boyer), who can make her a movie star, but things do not turn out well when the count's wife shows up.

Cast
 Sophia Loren as Antonietta Fallari
 Charles Boyer as Count Gregorio Sennetti
 Marcello Mastroianni as Corrado Betti
 Elisa Cegani as Elena Sennetti
 Titina De Filippo as Antonietta's mother
 Nino Besozzi as Paolo Magnano
 Memmo Carotenuto as Gustavo Ippoliti
 Giustino Durano as Federico Frotta

References

External links
 
 

1956 films
1956 comedy films
Italian comedy films
Italian black-and-white films
Films set in Rome
Films directed by Alessandro Blasetti
Films shot in Rome
Films with screenplays by Suso Cecchi d'Amico
Films scored by Alessandro Cicognini
1950s Italian films